The Europe Zone was one of the two regional zones of the 1929 International Lawn Tennis Challenge.

24 teams entered the Europe Zone, with the winner going on to compete in the Inter-Zonal Final against the winner of the America Zone. Germany defeated Great Britain in the final, and went on to face the United States in the Inter-Zonal Final.

Draw

First round

Denmark vs. Chile

Greece vs. Yugoslavia

Belgium vs. Romania

Austria vs. Czechoslovakia

Norway vs. Hungary

Monaco vs. Switzerland

Finland vs. Egypt

Second round

Ireland vs. Italy

Spain vs. Germany

Denmark vs. Greece

Czechoslovakia vs. Belgium

Hungary vs. Monaco

Netherlands vs. Egypt

Sweden vs. South Africa

Poland vs. Great Britain

Quarterfinals

Germany vs. Italy

Denmark vs. Czechoslovakia

Hungary vs. Netherlands

Great Britain vs. South Africa

Semifinals

Czechoslovakia vs. Germany

Hungary vs. Great Britain

Final

Germany vs. Great Britain

References

External links
Davis Cup official website

Davis Cup Europe/Africa Zone
Europe Zone
International Lawn Tennis Challenge